State Highway 12 (SH 12) is a New Zealand state highway in the far north of the North Island. It runs close to the west coast of the Northland Region of New Zealand.

Route
It then turns roughly westwards, reaching the Hokianga harbour at its Omanaia River arm. It continues west, reaching Opononi and Ōmāpere at the mouth of the harbour, before turning southeast to parallel the coast. The highway briefly follows the valley of the Waimamaku River before winding through the Waipoua Kauri Forest, then follows the valley of the Kaihu River to Dargaville. At Dargaville, the highway meets , and continues southeastwards along the edge of the Wairoa River to Ruawai before turning eastwards.

Major intersections

See also
List of New Zealand state highways
List of roads and highways, for notable or famous roads worldwide

References

External links
New Zealand Transport Agency

12
Transport in the Northland Region